HMS Boomerang was an  torpedo gunboat of the Royal Navy, originally named HMS Whiting, built by Armstrong Whitworth, Elswick, Tyne and Wear and launched on 24 July 1889. Renamed Boomerang on 2 April 1890, she formed part of the Auxiliary Squadron of the Australia Station.

Service details
Boomerang arrived in Sydney with the squadron on 5 September 1891. Lieutenant and commander Edward Matthew Hale was appointed in command on 15 February 1900.

She left the Australia Station on 22 August 1904. She was sold for £1,900 in July 1905 at Portsmouth.

Notes

References

Bastock, John (1988), Ships on the Australia Station, Child & Associates Publishing Pty Ltd; Frenchs Forest, Australia. 

1889 ships
Ships built by Armstrong Whitworth
Ships built on the River Tyne
Sharpshooter-class torpedo gunboats
Victorian-era gunboats of the United Kingdom